The name Annie has been used for three tropical cyclones world wide, one each in the: Australian region, South Pacific Ocean and South-West Indian Ocean.

In the Australian region:
 Cyclone Annie (1973)

In the South Pacific:
 Cyclone Annie (1967)

In the South-West Indian:
 Cyclone Annie (1968)

South-West Indian Ocean cyclone set index articles
Australian region cyclone set index articles